Chinese temples are sacred sites for the practice of Chinese folk religion and Chinese Buddhism. Kolkata has a significant population of Indian nationals of Chinese ethnic origin (immigrants and their descendants that emigrated from China starting in the late 18th century to work at the Kolkata port as well as the Chennai port). Unofficial estimates puts the population of Indian nationals of Chinese-origin in Kolkata anywhere from 5,000 to 200,000, most of whom live in or near Tangra. The Chinese brought with them their culture. At least eight of the Chinese temples are located in the old Chinatown around Tiretta Bazar in Central Kolkata.

Temples
Though the places of worship are referred to as "churches", they are sites of veneration that adhere to Chinese traditional religion and have nothing to do with Christianity. 
 Sea Ip Church (四邑會館)
 Toong On Church (東安會館) 
 Choonghee Dong Thien Haue Church 
 Gee Hing Church
 Sea Voi Yune Leong Futh Church (會寧會館)
 Nam Soon Church (南順會館)
 Hsuan Tsang Monastery

Gallery

See also
 Chinese folk religion
 Chinese folk religion in Southeast Asia
 List of Mazu temples
 Tin Hau temples in Hong Kong
 Kwan Tai temples in Hong Kong
 Hip Tin temples in Hong Kong
 List of City God Temples in China

References

External links
 List of Chinese Temples in Old Chinatown Kolkata

Religious buildings and structures in Kolkata
Temples in Chinese folk religion
Buddhist temples in India
Chinese-Indian culture
Overseas Chinese organisations